The 128th Pennsylvania House of Representatives District is located in Berks County and Lancaster County and includes the following areas:

Berks County
 Brecknock Township
 Caernarvon Township
 Cumru Township
 Exeter Township (PART, Precincts 03 and 07)
 Mohnton
 New Morgan
Berks County (continued)
 Robeson Township
 Shillington
 Wyomissing
 Lancaster County
 Brecknock Township

Representatives

References

Government of Berks County, Pennsylvania
Government of Lancaster County, Pennsylvania
128